The excitation temperature is defined for a population of particles via the Boltzmann factor. It satisfies 

where nu and  nl represent the number of particles in an upper (e.g. excited) and lower (e.g. ground) state, and gu and gl their statistical weights respectively.

Thus the excitation temperature is the temperature at which we would expect to find a system with this ratio of level populations. However it has no actual physical meaning except when in local thermodynamic equilibrium. The excitation temperature can even be negative for a system with inverted levels (such as a maser).

In observations of the 21 cm line of hydrogen, the apparent value of the excitation temperature is often called the "spin temperature".

References

Temperature